The Treaty of Friendship and Alliance (Traditional Chinese: 中蘇友好同盟條約) was a treaty signed by the National Government of the Republic of China and the Government of the Union of Soviet Socialist Republics on 14 August 1945. Soviet and Mongolian troops then occupied Inner Mongolia and Manchuria, after they had seized it from the Japanese during World War II. In a declaration made in connection with the treaty, China accepted the independence of Outer Mongolia within its previous borders and disavowed any Pan-Mongolist intentions of the occupiers if a referendum on the issue was held. Also, the Soviet Union ceased aiding the Chinese Communist Party and the Ili National Army, which were rebelling in Xinjiang. Both nations also agreed upon joint control of the Chinese Eastern Railway and to facilitate its eventual return to full Chinese sovereignty.

However, China noticed that the Soviet Union secretly and continuously supported the Chinese Communist Party and the People's Liberation Army, which opposed the ruling Kuomintang and the government of the Republic of China. The relation collapsed after the Chinese Communist Party had proclaimed the People's Republic of China in Beijing on 1 October 1949, which was recognized by the Soviet Union. The UN General Assembly adopted Resolution 505 on 1 February 1952, which confirmed that the Soviet Union had violated the terms of the treaty by assisting the Chinese Communist Party during the Chinese Civil War.

On 24 February 1953, the Legislative Yuan of the Republic of China voted to officially terminate its commitments to the Sino-Soviet Treaty of Friendship and Alliance as well and rescinded its recognition of the independence of the Mongolian People's Republic.

See also
Sino-Soviet Treaty of Friendship, Alliance and Mutual Assistance
United Nations General Assembly Resolution 505

References

External links
China, Soviet Union: Treaty of Friendship and Alliance

Treaties of the Soviet Union
China–Soviet Union relations
Treaties concluded in 1945
1945 in the Soviet Union
Treaties of the Republic of China (1912–1949)
1945 in China